Fool Moon is a 1993 comedy sketch and slapstick show written and performed by David Shiner and Bill Irwin. The show debuted on Broadway at the Richard Rogers Theater in 1993, and had two more Broadway runs in 1995 and 1998.

Alongside Shiner and Irwin, Fool Moon features The Red Clay Ramblers, who composed and performed music for the Broadway production of the play. The show won a Special Tony Award in 1999 and a Drama Desk Award for Unique Theatrical Experience.

References

External links

Broadway plays
Comedy plays
Drama Desk Award winners
1993 plays
Slapstick comedy